PNC Tower is a skyscraper in Downtown Louisville, Kentucky, and located at 101 South Fifth Street. This is the only building in Louisville that Harrison & Abramovitz designed, although the firm designed more than 15 buildings in New York, including the Socony–Mobil Building and the Axa Equitable Center.

The building, originally named First National Tower, was named after First National Bank and renamed National City Tower in 1994 when First National Bank was acquired by National City Bank.  The building was renamed PNC Tower in 2017.

PNC Tower was the tallest building in the state of Kentucky from 1972 until 400 West Market was completed in 1993.  The tower is constructed of steel columns on concrete piles of caissons with an anodized aluminum and glass curtain wall.  The Annex, constructed of reinforced concrete, houses the garage, retail space on the grade level and office space on the top level.

In February 2010, the National City logos on east and west sides of the tower were replaced with PNC Bank logos, due to PNC's takeover of National City Bank.

The building is currently leased by Jones Lang LaSalle. and managed by Cushman & Wakefield and owned by DB Oak Barrel LLC. Tenants include Humana Inc., PNC Bank, the Louisville branch of the Federal Reserve Bank of St. Louis, Bingham Greenebaum Doll PLLC, Dinsmore & Shohl LLP and Fultz Maddox Dickens PLC.

References

External links
 

Skyscraper office buildings in Louisville, Kentucky
Office buildings completed in 1972
1972 establishments in Kentucky
Harrison & Abramovitz buildings